George Baigent (14 June 1817 – 14 December 1854) was an English cricketer.  Baigent's batting style is unknown.  He was born at Northchapel, Sussex.

Baigent made two first-class appearances for Sussex in 1835 against Nottinghamshire and Yorkshire.  In the first match against Nottinghamshire at the Forest New Ground, Nottingham, Baigent was dismissed for a duck in Sussex's first-innings by Sam Redgate, while in their second-innings he opened the batting but was run out for 5.  Nottinghamshire won the match by 3 wickets.  Against Yorkshire at the Hyde Park Ground, Sheffield, he was run out for 4 in Sussex's first-innings, while in their second-innings he was dismissed for a duck by James Cobbett.  Yorkshire conceded the match at the end of Sussex's second-innings.

He died at Preston Park, Sussex on 14 December 1854.

References

External links
George Baigent at ESPNcricinfo
George Baigent at CricketArchive

1817 births
1854 deaths
People from Northchapel
English cricketers
Sussex cricketers